Francis Cann (born 6 February 1998) is a Ghanaian professional footballer who plays as a midfielder or winger for Al-Hazem on loan from F.C. Vizela.

Club career 
Born in Tema an industrial city in Ghana, Cann started his career in Ghana, playing for lower-tier side Charity Stars FC. In 2017, he secured a deal to F.C. Vizela youth side. He moved through the ranks but was later sent on a one-year loan to Vitoria SC U-23 in 2018–19 league campaign. Upon his return the following season, he played 8 league matches in the 2019–20 Campeonato de Portugal and scored 1 goal to help them gain promotion from the Campeonato de Portugal into the Liga Portugal 2. During the 2020–21 Liga Portugal 2, he played a key role by playing 30 league matches and scored 5 goals to them place 2nd and also gain promotion into the Primeira Liga for the first time in the club's history since 1985 after a 36-year absence.

In June 2021, ahead of the 2021–22 Primeira Liga, he signed a two-year contract extension deal with the newly promoted side.

On 26 January 2022, Cann officially joined Liga Portugal 2 side Mafra on a loan deal until the end of the season.

On 27 January 2023, Cann joined Saudi First Division League side Al-Hazem on a six-month loan.

International career 
Cann capped for Ghana at the U-20 level. He was part of the squad in 2016 that failed to qualify for the 2017 Africa U-20 Cup of Nations automatically losing their chances of qualifying for 2017 FIFA U-20 World Cup in South Korea.

References

External links 

 

Living people
1998 births
Association football midfielders
Association football wingers
Ghanaian footballers
F.C. Vizela players
Vitória S.C. B players
Al-Hazem F.C. players
Ghanaian expatriate footballers
Ghanaian expatriate sportspeople in Portugal
Ghanaian expatriate sportspeople in Saudi Arabia
Ghana youth international footballers
Expatriate footballers in Portugal
Expatriate footballers in Saudi Arabia
Liga Portugal 2 players
Campeonato de Portugal (league) players
Primeira Liga players
Saudi First Division League players
Charity Stars F.C. players